The Blue Mountain Formation (previously the Whitby Formation) is a geological formation of Upper Ordovician age (Maysvillian Stage), which outcrops in Ontario, Canada from Nottawasaga Bay southeastward to the Toronto area.

References

Stratigraphy of Ontario